The Central Design and Research Bureau of Sporting and Hunting Arms, abbreviated TsKIB SOO is a Russian small arms design bureau based in Tula, Russia. It was established in 1946, and it is currently managed as a branch of the KBP Instrument Design Bureau.

Products
Notable products designed at TsKIB SOO include:
 high-quality custom hunting shotguns (MTs 5, MTs 6, MTs 7, MTs 8, MTs 30, MTs 109, MTs 110, MTs 111, MTs255 etc.)
 TKB-022PM, TKB-0146, TKB-408, TKB-517 assault rifle prototypes
 OTs-38 Stechkin silent revolver
 OTs-14 Groza assault rifle
 ASh-12.7 12.7 mm battle rifle
 OSV-96 12.7 mm sniper rifle
 12.7mm NSV machine gun and Afanasev A-12.7 machine gun
 40mm GP-25/GP-30/GP-34 and RG-6 grenade launchers
 AGS-40 Balkan 40 mm automatic grenade launcher
 Afanasev Makarov AM-23 aircraft cannon
 "Rys" series of shotguns

References

External links
 Official website

Design companies established in 1946
High Precision Systems
Companies based in Tula Oblast
Defence companies of the Soviet Union
Manufacturing companies established in 1946
1946 establishments in the Soviet Union
Design bureaus
Research institutes in the Soviet Union